The Belgian Basketball Supercup, also called the Generali Supercup for sponsorship reasons, is a men’s professional basketball game in Belgium, which is played by the champion of the Basketball League Belgium Division I (Belgian champion) and the winner of the Belgian Basketball Cup. It is a super cup competition. The game is played in Knokke.

Belgian Supercup games
Supercup winner listed in yellow and bold.

Notes

 – Team qualified as the runner-up of the Belgian Cup competition, because the same team won both the Belgian League and Belgian Cup.

Supercup winners

References

 
1979 establishments in Belgium
Supercup
Basketball supercup competitions in Europe